Seelye is a surname. Notable people with the surname include:

 Elizabeth Eggleston Seelye (1858-1923), American writer
 Frederick Thomas Seelye (1879–1962), New Zealand chemist and academic
 Gilbert T. Seelye (1877–1928), New York politician
 Julius Hawley Seelye (1824–1895), American missionary, writer and politician
 Kate Seelye, American journalist
 Laurenus Clark Seelye (1837–1924), American college president
 Talcott Williams Seelye (1922–2006), American diplomat and writer

See also
 Seeley (surname)
 Seelye Brook